Seine was a 38-gun French Seine-class frigate that the Royal Navy captured in 1798 and commissioned as the fifth-rate HMS Seine. On 20 August 1800, Seine captured the French ship  in a single ship action that would win for her crew the Naval General Service Medal. Seine's career ended in 1803 when she hit a sandbank near the Texel.

French career
Seine was a 40-gun frigate built between May 1793 and March 1794 at Le Havre, having been launched on 19 December 1793. Seines career with the French Navy lasted less than five years.

On 14 July 1794 she and  captured the 16-gun sloop-of-war  in the Atlantic. In late 1794, L'Hermitte's squadron sailed for Norway.

The squadron found itself blocked by cold and damage in a Norwegian harbour during the entire winter of 1794–95, sustaining over 250 dead from illness out of a total complement of 880. In spring, Seine and Galathée returned to France, leaving Républicaine to care for the untransportable sick. They eventually were rescued by the corvette Subtile.

Seine then sailed for Île de France.

The French took off her crew, except for two seamen and a boy, and put Fortes fourth officer and 13-man prize crew aboard Lord Hawkesbury with orders to sail to Île de France. On her way there one of the British seamen, who was at the helm, succeeded in running her aground on the east coast of Africa a little north of the Cape, wrecking her. There were no casualties, but the prize crew became British prisoners.

Seine reached Île de France where she joined the squadron under Sercey. She took part in the action of 8 September 1796. In March 1798, she sailed from Île de France and was on her way to Lorient when she encountered a British frigate squadron in the Breton Passage on 30 June 1798.

 and  chased her down and captured her at the action of 30 June 1798. Seine was commanded by Capitaine Bigot and was armed with forty-two 18 and 9-pounder guns. She had a crew of 610 men, including troops.

In the engagement Seine lost 170 men killed and some 100 men wounded, many mortally. Jason had seven men killed and 12 wounded. Pique lost one man killed, six wounded, and one man missing. In the fight Jason, Pique and Seine grounded; Pique was lost, but , which had arrived on the scene, was able to get Seine off. Although the casualties aboard Seine had been high she was not badly damaged and Captain David Milne, who had been captain of Pique, and his crew transferred to her. Her captors sailed her into Portsmouth, arriving there on 18 July; Milne commanded Seine for the rest of her career.

British career
The Royal Navy took Seine into service under an Admiralty order dated 14 September 1798. She then spent several months fitting out at Portsmouth for the sum of £14,755. She was re-rated as a 38-gun frigate and Milne commissioned her in November.

On 13 February 1799 Seine captured Graff Bernstoff. Roughly a month later, on 18 March, Seine and Sea Gull recaptured Industry. That same day, in a probably related encounter, Seine was in sight when the hired armed brig  captured the French privateer Hirondelle in a notable action.

In 1800 Seine was at West Africa before she sailed for Jamaica in July. On 20 August 1800 Seine attacked the French ship, which had just finished refitting at Curaçao. The vessels broke off action and Seine was unable to resume the engagement until 25 August. Then, after an hour and a half of hard fighting, Seine captured the French frigate. Both ships had sustained heavy casualties; 13 crew were killed aboard the Seine, 29 were wounded, and the ship was cut up. However, Vengeance sustained worse; almost cut to pieces, many considered her beyond repair. Nevertheless Vengeance was repaired in Jamaica and taken into British service under her existing name. In 1847 the Admiralty authorized the issue of the Naval General Service Medal with clasp "Seine 20 Augt. 1800" to all surviving claimants from this action.

He declared that as Seine had done what Constellation could not, British naval forces were "more potent than American thunder". That said, Vengeance had been heavily armed with twenty-eight 18-pounder guns (main deck), sixteen 12-pounder guns and eight 42-pounder carronades (QD and Fc), brass swivel guns on the gunwales, with shifting guns on the main and quarter decks.

By March 1801 Seine was at Jamaica, as part of the fleet under Lord Hugh Seymour. She was then paid off in 1802.

Fate
Seine underwent a refit at Chatham Dockyard between June and July 1803, with Milne recommissioning her in May for the North Sea. However, shortly after her return to service she grounded on a sandbank to the northward of Terschelling on 21 July 1803. That evening Milne had ordered the pilots to keep her out of shallow water and they had assured him that she was safe; forty minutes later she struck. The crew labored all night and well into the morning, with the assistance of two passing merchant vessels to pull her off and to lighten her, but to no avail. At about 11:30am the crew abandoned Seine; they set fire to her as they left to prevent the French recapturing her.

A court martial on 4 August 1803 honourably acquitted Captain Milne, his officers and crew for the loss of the vessel. However, it found the pilots guilty of ignorance. The court martial sentenced them to be mulcted of all their wages for two years and to be imprisoned in the Marshalsea for two years.

Notes, citations, and references
Notes

Citations

References

External links
 

 

Frigates of the Royal Navy
Shipwrecks in the North Sea
1793 ships
Maritime incidents in 1803
Ships built in France
Captured ships